Bruce MacGregor (born April 26, 1941) is a Canadian former professional ice hockey forward who played for the Detroit Red Wings and New York Rangers of the National Hockey League (NHL), and the Edmonton Oilers of the World Hockey Association (WHA). During his NHL career, MacGregor scored 213 goals and 257 assists in 893 games. He won 5 Stanley Cups with the Edmonton Oilers as the assistant general manager in 1984, 1985, 1987, 1988, 1990.

Awards and achievements
1983–84 - NHL - Stanley Cup (Edmonton)
1984–85 - NHL - Stanley Cup (Edmonton)
1986–87 - NHL - Stanley Cup (Edmonton)
1987–88 - NHL - Stanley Cup (Edmonton)
1989–90 - NHL - Stanley Cup (Edmonton)
 Inducted Alberta Sports Hall of Fame 2015

Career statistics

Regular season and playoffs

International

References

External links

1941 births
Living people
Alberta Sports Hall of Fame inductees
Canadian ice hockey centres
Canadian ice hockey coaches
Detroit Red Wings players
Edmonton Flyers (WHL) players
Edmonton Oil Kings (WCHL) players
Edmonton Oilers (WHA) players
Edmonton Oilers coaches
Edmonton Oilers executives
New York Rangers players
Ice hockey people from Edmonton
Stanley Cup champions
World Hockey Association broadcasters